Benjamin W. Dean (January 26, 1827 – July 6, 1861) was a Vermont attorney and politician.  He served in the Vermont House of Representatives and as Secretary of State of Vermont.

Biography
Benjamin Willey Dean was born in Manchester, Vermont on January 26, 1827, and was the son of Peter Werden Dean and Philinda (Willey) Dean.  He attended Colby College, graduated from Dartmouth College in 1848, and received a master's degree from Dartmouth in 1851.  Dean joined the Delta Kappa Epsilon fraternity while attending Colby.  While at Dartmouth, he became a member of the Alpha Delta Phi fraternity.

Dean studied law with attorneys Abishai Stoddard of Grafton, and Charles J. Walker of Bellows Falls, and attended State and National Law School.  He was admitted to the bar in 1852, and practiced in Elmira, New York before relocating to Vermont, where he practiced first in Bellows Falls, and then in Grafton.

An active participant in the Baptist church, Dean was a life member of the American Baptist Missionary Union.

A Republican, Dean served in local offices including register of probate for the Windham County district.  In 1856 and 1857 he served in the Vermont House of Representatives.  In 1857, Dean became Vermont's Secretary of State, and he served in this position until 1861.

Death and burial
Dean died in Grafton on July 6, 1861.  According to news reports, he had been ill with lung hemorrhages in the weeks before his death, but appeared to be recovering.  He died after unexpected and severe hemorrhages left him unable to breathe.  Dean was buried at Grafton Village Cemetery in Grafton.

Family
In 1853, Dean married Fannie Angeline Cobb of South Windham.  They were the parents of three daughters: Mary Emma (1853–1906), who was the wife of Chapin Howard (1852–1903); Harriet ("Hattie") (1856–1940), the wife of Dr. Arthur H. Tufts (1856–1931); and Lucy (1862–1942), the wife of Dr. Rollin E. Woodworth (1866–1932).

References

Sources

Books

Newspapers

Internet

Magazines

1827 births
1861 deaths
Politicians from Elmira, New York
People from Manchester, Vermont
People from Grafton, Vermont
Colby College alumni
State and National Law School alumni
Dartmouth College alumni
New York (state) lawyers
Vermont lawyers
Republican Party members of the Vermont House of Representatives
Secretaries of State of Vermont
Burials in Vermont
19th-century American politicians
19th-century American lawyers